Geschichte vom braven Kasperl und dem schönen Annerl (or The Story of Just Casper and Fair Annie in English) is a novella by Clemens Brentano, first published in 1817 in the book Gaben der Milde, edited by Friedrich Wilhelm Gubitz.

References

See also
 Geschichte vom braven Kasperl und dem schönen Annerl in German Language

German novellas
1817 German novels